Markt Einersheim is a market town and municipality in the district of Kitzingen in Bavaria, Germany. On April 5, 1945, at the end of World War II, the town was bombed by United States Army Air Forces P-47 Thunderbolts. American troops captured the town from German forces, who retreated to the southeast, on April 6.

References

External links
Official website

Kitzingen (district)